Vân Khánh (born 1 January 1978 in Quảng Trị) is a Vietnamese traditional folk singer. She began as a child artist with a family troupe at the age of 12. Her albums have helped to popularize Central Vietnam's folk music with urban audiences in Ho Chi Minh City.

Albums
 “Bông lau Trắng”
 “Thương Huế mùa đông”
 “Tưởng như Huế trong lòng”
 “Huế xưa”
 “Một thời Tôn Nữ”
 “Thương mãi câu hò"
  "Hoài niệm trường giang"
  "Huế ngày trở về"
  "Đêm phương nam nghe câu hò huế"
  "Con đường mang tên em"
  "VCD Vẫn là Em"
  "CD-DVD Chỉ là Mơ thôi"
  singer on "Hotel Vietnam" by Japan's Blue Asia band. King Records

References

1978 births
Living people
People from Quảng Trị province
People from Ho Chi Minh City
Vietnamese women singers